Augusto Rho (1 August 1888 – 9 November 1963) was an Italian racing cyclist. He rode in the 1909 Tour de France, the inaugural 1909 Giro d'Italia and several others since, including the 1924 Tour de France. He was 11th in the 1910 Giro d'Italia general classification.

Biography
Albert Londres, covering the 1924 Tour de France for Le Parisien, wrote that Rho resembled Gabriele D'Annunzio and sang even when he was last.

Personal life
Augusto Rho is buried in the Cimitero Maggiore di Milano (2nd central ossuary) near his family.

References

External links
 

1888 births
1963 deaths
Italian male cyclists